Babysitter is a four-episode Korean drama, airing on KBS2 from March 14, 2016, starring Cho Yeo-jeong, Kim Min-jun, Shin Yoon-joo, and Lee Seung-joon.

Synopsis
Jang Suk-ryoo (Shin Yoon-joo) is a 24-year-old university graduate who majors in English literature. As she begins to work as a babysitter for a rich family with three children, strange events start happening, resulting in an ambiguous relationship with the father, Lee Sang-won (Kim Min-jun).

Cast
 Cho Yeo-jeong as Chun Eun-joo
 Kim Min-jun as Yoo Sang-won
 Shin Yoon-joo as Jang Suk-ryoo
 Lee Seung-joon as Pyo Young-gyoon
 Gil Hae-yeon as Yoo Sang-won's mother
 Kim Mi-ra as Housework assistant
 Kim Ye-rang as Chun Eun-joo's friend
 Hwang Eun-soo as Yoo Sang-won's college friend
 Yoon Ji-min as Yoo Eun-byul
 Ri Min as Im Tae-young
 Kim Do-joon as Reporter
 Kim Hyun as Mi-yeong's friend
 Lee Won-jong as Yoo Sang-won's father
 Kim Sang-ho as Jo Sang-won

Ratings
In this table,  represent the lowest ratings and  represent the highest ratings.

Awards and nominations

References

External links
  
 
 

Korean Broadcasting System television dramas
2016 South Korean television series debuts
2016 South Korean television series endings
South Korean suspense television series
South Korean thriller television series
Korean-language television shows
Television series by Signal Entertainment Group